Alabama House of Representatives, District 4 is one of 105 districts in the Alabama House of Representatives. Its current representative is Parker Moore. It was created in 1967 and encompasses parts of Limestone and Morgan counties. As of the 2010 census, the district has a population of 51,181, with 76.2% being of legal voting age.

List of representatives

References 

04
1967 establishments in Alabama